Śledzianów  is a village in the administrative district of Gmina Drohiczyn, within Siemiatycze County, Podlaskie Voivodeship, in north-eastern Poland.

According to the 1921 census, the village was inhabited by 328 people, among whom 323 were Roman Catholic, 6 Orthodox, 1 Greek Catholic and 12 Mosaic. At the same time, 313 inhabitants declared Polish nationality, 12 Jewish, 6 Belarusian, and 1 another. There were 42 residential buildings in the village.

References

Villages in Siemiatycze County